Tarbagatay is a rural locality (a selo) in Khorinsky District of the Republic of Buryatia, Russia. Population:

References 

Rural localities in Khorinsky District